SMS Lussin was a torpedo cruiser of the Austro-Hungarian Navy, a modified version of the preceding . As envisaged by the Marinekommandant (Navy Commander), Vice Admiral Friedrich von Pöck, Lussin would be the leader of a flotilla of torpedo boats, with the additional capability of carrying out scouting duties. The ship proved to be too slow and too lightly armed for either of these tasks, so she spent the majority of her career as a training ship for engine and boiler room personnel, along with occasional stints with the main fleet for training exercises. She took part in only one significant operation, an international blockade of Greece in 1886 to prevent the country from declaring war on the Ottoman Empire. In 1910–1913, Lussin was rebuilt as an admiralty yacht, and she spent World War I as a barracks ship for German U-boat crews based in Pola. After the war, she was ceded to Italy as a war prize, renamed Sorrento, and briefly saw service as a mother ship for MAS boats from 1924 to 1928, when she was discarded.

Design
In the early 1880s, Vice Admiral Friedrich von Pöck, the head of the Marinesektion (Admiralty), ordered four torpedo cruisers. Pöck was unable to secure funding for new ironclads, and so he turned to less expensive vessels to modernize the fleet. The ships would fill several roles, including scouting for the ironclad fleet and leading flotillas of torpedo boats. The first three of the new vessels—the —were built to the same basic design.

While  was still undergoing sea trials, Josef von Romako began design work on a fourth cruiser, along with the engineer A. Waldvogel. Romako outlined his plan in a meeting with the design staff on 10 June 1881. The new ship was to have a longer hull for finer lines, particularly in the aft part of the hull, to allow it to reach higher speeds. The preceding Zara-class cruisers had been unable to reach their design speed, so Romako hoped to rectify the problem with Lussin. The longer hull, with a propulsion system rated at  should produce a top speed of  according to Waldvogel. After lengthy negotiations, The Marinesektion assigned construction of the ship to Stabilimento Tecnico Triestino on 22 September 1881.

As neither Lussin or the earlier Zara-class cruisers met the requirements of the Marinesektion, Vice Admiral Maximilian Daublebsky von Sterneck, who had replaced Pöck in November 1883, decided that further torpedo cruisers would be ordered from more experienced, foreign shipyards.

Characteristics
She displaced  as designed and up to  fully laden.

The engine rooms were poorly ventilated, and after two hours of operation they would be so overheated that the crew had to cool the machinery with water.

The ship was armed with two  21-caliber (cal.) guns in single mounts and one /18 landing gun. Five  quick-firing guns were added in 1887. She was also armed with one  torpedo tubes submerged in the bow.

Service history

Construction – 1895

The keel for Lussin was laid down at the Stabilimento Tecnico Triestino shipyard at San Rocco in September 1882. She was scheduled to be launched on 13 September 1883, but delays in the completion of her hull pushed her launching to 22 December. Completion of the ship was delayed further by a strike of the workers at the STT shipyard; this was the first time a strike had delayed the construction of a vessel for the Austro-Hungarian Navy. After her engines and boilers were installed, she was towed to Pola on 12 July 1884 by the paddle steamer Triton. In early October, she began sea trials, and on 21 February 1885, she completed her speed tests. She was commissioned for service the following day, and from 27 March to 30 April embarked on a cruise in the southern Adriatic Sea before operating with the main Austro-Hungarian ironclad squadron until it was disbanded for the year on 17 July.

The ship took part in an international naval demonstration in mid-1886 aimed at preventing a war between Greece and the Ottoman Empire. Lussin joined the ironclad , six torpedo boats, and several wooden vessels for the operation. After Greece refused to demobilize, the international fleet blockaded several Greek ports; Lussin and the rest of the Austro-Hungarian squadron blockaded Volos in May, and by June, the Greek government had conceded; Lussins period of service in Greek waters lasted from 7 May to 19 June. By 23 June, she had returned to Pola, where she was decommissioned the next day. She was reactivated for service with the training squadron from 8 May to 6 June 1887, but she spent the following year in reserve. Too slow to perform the duties of a fleet scout or a torpedo-boat flotilla leader, Lussin was removed from frontline service in 1890. Lussin was reclassified as a training ship for engine-room personnel in 1889, and for boiler-room personnel the next year.

The ship continued to take part in the annual fleet maneuvers, including serving with the summer training squadron from 10 May to 29 June 1890. She also participated in the exercises for 1891. In 1893, Lussin continued in service as a training ship and she was also assigned to the Torpedo-boat Division. On 7 November, she collided with the torpedo boat  in the Hvar Channel. From 1 May to 15 August 1894, the ship served with the training squadron, with the rest of that year and 1895 filled with her routine training duties. On 18 February 1895, the ship ran aground on the northern end of the island of Koločep, and had to be towed free by the cruiser  on the 24th.

1896–1928

In 1896, the ship received new boilers. She returned to her previous duty as a training ship for engine and boiler room crews the following year, which lasted through most of 1898. On 1 October 1898, she became a mother ship for torpedo boats, which lasted until 30 March 1899. The year 1900 was spent in reserve, and she was reactivated on 23 February 1901 for training duties, which lasted until 10 May. Another stint in the reserve lasted until 1 January 1903, when she was reactivated for service as a station ship in Teodo. She served in this capacity until 27 November 1909; three days later, she was decommissioned. On 30 December, the Marinesektion instructed the Marinetechnisches Komitee (MTK – Naval Technical Committee) to examine how Lussin should be modified so it could be rebuilt to replace the old paddle steamer Fantasie as an admiralty yacht. The MTK determined that the ship should receive new diesel engines, and on 5 April 1910, work began on dismantling her old propulsion system. The reconstruction work ended in 1913 and she was recommissioned in her new role.

After the outbreak of World War I, Lussin was converted once again, in 1916, as a barracks ship for German U-boat crews based in Pola. After Austria-Hungary's defeat, the ship was surrendered to Italy as a war prize in 1920, who renamed her Sorrento. In Italian service, she was rearmed with four  40-cal. anti-aircraft guns. She was recommissioned on 11 September 1924 with a crew of 3 officers and 42 men as a depot ship for MAS motor torpedo boats. Sorrento was stricken from the naval register in 1928 and sold for scrap.

Notes

References

Further reading
 

Cruisers of the Austro-Hungarian Navy
Ships built in Trieste
1883 ships
World War I cruisers of Austria-Hungary